Franciszek Kleeberg (1 February 1888, in Tarnopol – 5 April 1941, near Dresden) was a Polish general. He served in the Austro-Hungarian Army before joining the Polish Legions in World War I and following the Polish Independence later the Polish Army. During the German Invasion of Poland he commanded Independent Operational Group Polesie. He never lost a battle in the Invasion of Poland, although he was eventually forced to surrender after his forces ran out of ammunition. Imprisoned in Oflag IV-B Koenigstein, he died in hospital in Dresden on 5 April 1941 and was buried there.

Early life
General Franciszek Kleeberg was born on 1 February 1888 in Tarnopol (then part of Austro-Hungarian Empire, next Tarnopol in interwar Poland again, now Ternopil Ukraine). He was of German and Swedish ancestry on his paternal side. His father, an officer of the Austrian Dragoons, took part in the Polish uprising of 1863/64. After the fall of the uprising he returned home, and according to the family legend said: "Now the country, Poland, will need good soldiers. 'Franek' will be a soldier." After graduation from the military vocational school at Hranice (Mährisch Weißkirchen) in Moravia, Kleeberg continued studies at military academy in Mödling, Lower Austria. Promoted to the 2nd Lieutenant in artillery, he served in the capital Vienna, where he completed studies at the Academy of the General Staff (k.u.k. Kriegsschule).

War experience
He took part in the First World War, first in the Austro-Hungarian army, and after May 1915 as an officer in the Polish Legion. He commanded a regiment in the Polish–Soviet War of 1919-21. In 1925 he completed studies at a French military school in Paris and became the commander of the Supreme Military School in Warsaw. After Jozef Pilsudski's coup d'état, he was dismissed from that post in 1927 and sent to command an infantry division in Grodno.

World War II
At the time of the outbreak of World War II he was the commander of the IX Army Corps in Brzesc in the rear operational zone.  Yet soon the situation changed in view of massive enemy air raids and rapid advance of its armoured and mechanized troops. On 11 September 1939 his corps were transformed into the Operation Group Polesie, but were lacking in heavy equipment, and on by 14 September were already in combat with the most advanced German troops. General Kleeberg managed to organize a defence by withdrawing dispersed units from under the strike of the German forces, but found many of his units also attacked by the Red army. He also managed to gather remnants of the Polish forces destroyed in the east to Vistula and south-east to Narew into a new grouping, with which he tried to break through towards besieged Warsaw. After hearing of Warsaw's capitulation, he dug his troops in, resulting in the battle of Kock. On 5 October 1939 General Kleeberg decided to surrender, as his forces were out of ammunition and food.

Death
General Kleeberg was imprisoned in Oflag IV-B Koenigstein, where he lost his sight and became unable to walk. He died aged 53 in the camp hospital and was buried in Dresden. In 1969, his remains were exhumed, brought to Poland and re-buried in Kock among the fallen soldiers of the Operation Group Polesie.

Promotions
 podporucznik (lieutenant) – August 1908
 porucznik (first lieutenant) – May 1913
 kapitan (captain) – November 1915
 major (major) – August 1917
 podpułkownik (lieutenant colonel) – December 1918
 pułkownik (colonel) – April 1920
 generał brygady (brigadier general) – January 1928
 generał dywizji (major general) – January 1943 (post-mortem)

Military awards
 Virtuti Militari, Commander's Cross, (previously awarded Knight's Cross, Golden Cross and Silver Cross)
 Polonia Restituta, Grand Cross awarded posthumously on 4 October 2009; (previously awarded Commander's Cross and Officer's Cross)
 Cross of Valour 4 times
 Military Merit Medal (Signum Laudis) (Austria-Hungary)
 Commander of the Légion d'honneur (France)
 Iron Cross of 1914, 2nd Class (Germany)
 Order of Lāčplēsis, 3rd Class (Latvia)
 Gold Cross of Merit (1937)

See also
 Battle of Kock

References
 Stanley S. Seidner, Marshal Edward Śmigły-Rydz Rydz and the Defense of Poland, New York, 1978.

External links
 Bohater "Polesia" at Rzeczpospolita Weekend, 1 February 2013.
 Important dates in career
 

1888 births
1941 deaths
People from Ternopil
People from the Kingdom of Galicia and Lodomeria
Polish people of German descent
Polish people of Swedish descent
Polish generals
Austro-Hungarian military personnel of World War I
Polish legionnaires (World War I)
Polish people of the Polish–Ukrainian War
People of the Polish May Coup (pro-government side)
Polish military personnel of World War II
Polish prisoners of war
World War II prisoners of war held by Germany
Commandeurs of the Légion d'honneur
Commanders of the Virtuti Militari
Grand Crosses of the Order of Polonia Restituta
Recipients of the Cross of Valour (Poland)
Recipients of the Order of Lāčplēsis, 3rd class
Recipients of the Iron Cross (1914), 2nd class
Recipients of the Gold Cross of Merit (Poland)